Muirgheas Ua Cú Ceannainn (died 1106) was King of Uí Díarmata.

Biography

The Annals of Ulster record that "Niall Odar ua Conchobuir was killed. Muirgius ua Conchenaind died.", but no connection is drawn between the two events. Muirgius's apparent successor was Aedh Ua Con Ceannainn.

References
 Vol. 2 (AD 903–1171): edition and translation
 Annals of Ulster at CELT: Corpus of Electronic Texts at University College Cork
 Annals of Tigernach at CELT: Corpus of Electronic Texts at University College Cork
Revised edition of McCarthy's synchronisms at Trinity College Dublin.

People from County Galway
1106 deaths
11th-century Irish monarchs
12th-century Irish monarchs
Year of birth unknown